Nur Fidrah Noh (born 16 May 1986) is a Malaysian lawn bowler.

Bowls career

World Championship
Noh won a bronze medal in the fours at the 2008 World Outdoor Bowls Championship in Christchurch, New Zealand and fours year later won a silver medal in the fours at the 2012 World Outdoor Bowls Championship in Adelaide.

In 2016, she won a bronze medal with Azlina Arshad and Nor Hashimah Ismail in the triples at the 2016 World Outdoor Bowls Championship in Christchurch.

Commonwealth Games
In 2014 she competed in both the women's triples and women's fours events at the 2014 Commonwealth Games. She failed to qualify from the group stages in the women's triples event but won a silver medal in the women's fours

Asia Pacific
Noh has won six medals at the Asia Pacific Bowls Championshipsincluding three gold medals and two medals at the 2019 Asia Pacific Bowls Championships in the Gold Coast, Queensland.

Southeast Asian Games
In addition to the major medals won she has also won two gold medals in the Lawn bowls at the Southeast Asian Games.

National
She won the 2007 singles title at the New Zealand National Bowls Championships when bowling as an overseas invitational player.

References

1986 births
Living people
Asian Games competitors for Malaysia
Bowls players at the 2010 Commonwealth Games
Bowls players at the 2014 Commonwealth Games
Commonwealth Games silver medallists for Malaysia
Malaysian female bowls players
Malaysian people of Malay descent
Malaysian Muslims
People from Johor
Commonwealth Games medallists in lawn bowls
Southeast Asian Games medalists in lawn bowls
Southeast Asian Games gold medalists for Malaysia
Competitors at the 2007 Southeast Asian Games
Competitors at the 2017 Southeast Asian Games
21st-century Malaysian women
Medallists at the 2014 Commonwealth Games